Canal de la Reina is a 1972 Filipino novel written by Filipino novelist Liwayway A. Arceo. The novel exposes the social cancer in the high levels of contemporary Philippine society. The social cancer, based on the novel, is masked by the flamboyance and the pomposity of the affluent members of Filipino society.

Title and setting 
The novel takes its name from the titular Estero de la Reina (sometimes called the Canal de la Reina) - one of the rivulets, known as esteros, which delineated the small islands which historically constituted the City of Manila.  Estero de la Reina is a manmade estro, which was dug through the fishponds of Bindondo during Spanish times, in order to
facilitate the passage of shipped goods.

Plot 
The story begins with the De Los Angeles family arriving at the matriarch's (Caridad) old home. Upon seeing the place, Junior and Leni, Caridad's children, are immediately repulsed by their surroundings and hesitantly leave the car they arrived in along with their father, Salvador, enlisting the help of a young boy to watch it for 25 centavos.

Vicenta Marcial, also known as Nyora Tentay (the term senyora is the Filipino word for the Spanish term señora, meaning "Mrs."; nyora is the condensed term for senyora), is the matriarch of the wealthy Marcial family, and is labelled the "queen of Canal de la Reina". She is a money lender who charges high interest rates. She lives with her maid, Dominga Canlas (Ingga), whom she often mistreats, making her starve, and not giving her the right salary at the right time.

Nyora Tentay has a son, Victor Marcial, who is married to Gracia. They have a son, Gerry.

Nyora Tentay buys a piece of land belonging to the De Los Angeles family, from their former caretaker, Precioso Santos (Osyong). She then uses bribery to assert her claim over the family's land.

The De Los Angeles family's lawyer, Atty. Agulto, finds out that Nyora Tentay's documents to the land at Canal dela Reina were falsified. That the family had sold to land to Osyong, then Osyong sold it to Nyora Tentay, even though it did not happen.

A flood occurs at Canal de la Reina, which damages buildings and structures. Nyora Tentay and Ingga part ways after the flood. Ingga is welcomed at the De Los Angeles' home, through the help of Junior. Caridad then finds Nyora Tentay's documents, which Ingga was able to save and bring with her. Despite her resistance, Ingga was eventually convinced by Caridad to return the documents to Nyora Tentay. Victor meets Junior, who was requested by Ingga to return the documents.

Caridad was able to meet with Osyong's wife, Tisya, who explained what really happened: Nyora Tentay threatened to send her and Osyong to prison if he does not sell the land to her, and that doing such is the only way they could pay for their debts to her.

Victor then convinces Nyora Tentay, who ended up in the hospital, to return the land at Canal dela Reina to its rightful owners, the De Los Angeles family, but she shuns him away in the middle of their conversation and tells him she no longer wants to talk to him.

Leni passes her licensure exam and becomes a full-fledged doctor. She and Gerry get married.

The De Los Angeles family members re-visit the land at Canal de la Reina. Junior tells his parents that he sees great things in store for the whole place.

See also 
Ang Tundo Man May Langit Din

References 

1972 novels
Books published by university presses
Novels set in the Philippines
Philippine romance novels
Political novels
Tagalog-language novels